The Baths is a beach area on the island of Virgin Gorda among the British Virgin Islands in the Caribbean.

Geography
The Baths is an area of unique geologic formations and one of the BVI's major tourist destinations.

Area
Although volcanism accounts for much of the Virgin Islands, The Baths was formed by granite that eroded into piles of boulders on the beach. Granite forms from the slow cooling of magma at depth nowhere close to surface volcanoes. The granite only appears at the surface after geologic ages have eroded away all the overburden covering it. Once exposed, erosion continued to isolate the granite into large boulders and round their surfaces. The boulders form natural tidal pools, tunnels, arches, and scenic grottoes that are open to the sea.

Since 1990, the area has been a BVI National Park  as are the adjacent bays, and the area is a major tourist attraction, with swimming and snorkelling being the main attractions.

Gallery

Notes

External links

 about The Baths
 about The Baths
 map of The Baths area
 pictures from The Baths
 pictures from The Baths
 about The Baths National Park

Geography of the British Virgin Islands
Water in the British Virgin Islands
Virgin Gorda